Pleurothallis calamifolia is a species of orchid native to Colombia and Venezuela. It was named in 1996 and the holotype is from cloud forest in Colombia.

References

calamifolia
Flora of Colombia
Flora of Venezuela